The Solomon Islands ambassadors to Taiwan were the official representatives of Solomon Islands government in the period from 1983 to 2019 when Solomon Islands recognised Taiwan. On 15 September 2019, the parliament of Solomon Islands voted to change diplomatic recognition from the Republic of China (Taiwan) to the People's Republic of China. Consequently, Joseph Waleanisia was the last ambassador to Taiwan.
See list of ambassadors of Solomon Islands to China for ambassadors since 15 September 2019.

List of representatives

See also 
 List of ambassadors of Solomon Islands to China
 List of diplomatic missions in Solomon Islands
 List of diplomatic missions of Solomon Islands
 Minister of Foreign Affairs (Solomon Islands)

References 

 
Solomon Islands
Taiwan